Rock & Roll Jeopardy! is an American television game show, created by Scott Sternberg, and adapted from the quiz show Jeopardy!, created by Merv Griffin. The show debuted on VH1 on August 8, 1998 and ran for four seasons, ending in December 2001. Hosted by Jeff Probst, this version featured largely identical play to the parent program, but highlighted post-1950s popular music trivia rather than focusing on general knowledge. Loretta Fox was the show's original announcer, with Stew Herrera later replacing her.

Format
Instead of the actual amount won during the three rounds of game play, the champions on Rock & Roll Jeopardy! were awarded $5,000, regardless of their score, and non-winners received consolation prizes, which were $2,000 for the second-place contestant and $1,000 for the third-place contestant (like the parent series). For the first two seasons, the clue values were in points, but they were changed to dollars for the final two seasons with the guaranteed minimum for the winner being $5,000. Numerous rock musicians appeared in celebrity editions of the show, playing for charitable organizations of their choice.

As was the case with Jeopardy!, Rock & Roll Jeopardy! production involved most of the daily syndicated Jeopardy! then-current personnel, and its copyright holder was identified in show credits as Trackdown Productions, Inc. Again, the show was taped at Stage 11 of the Sony Studios, rather than Stage 10. Years after the cancellation, the parent program began to use Rock & Roll Jeopardy!'s main theme and think music (electric-guitar renditions of "Think!" written and performed by Steve Kaplan) in its Kids Weeks, Teen Tournaments and the College Championships.  In Series 36, for the College Championship, it was replaced with Sports Jeopardy! cues.  (The College Championship used an entirely new theme from Bleeding Fingers Music in Series 38.)

References

External links
 Official site for Rock & Roll Jeopardy!
 Official site for ''Rock & Roll Jeopardy!
 Official Rock & Roll Jeopardy! online site
 Official GSN site for Rock & Roll Jeopardy!

VH1 original programming
1990s American game shows
2000s American game shows
1998 American television series debuts
2001 American television series endings
American television spin-offs
Musical game shows
Television series by Sony Pictures Television
Jeopardy!